Ilex laevigata (Pursh) A. Gray, commonly referred to as smooth winterberry, is a plant species in the Aquifoliaceae (holly family).  It is native to the eastern coastal United States.

References

laevigata
Trees of the Southeastern United States